Hybomitra ciureai is a Palearctic species of horse fly in the family Tabanidae. Continental authorities apply the name solstitialis to the coastal species Hybomitra ciureai  of British authorities and regard British solstitialis as var. collini of Hybomitra bimaculata.

References

External links
Images representing Hybomitra solstialis
Martin C. Harvey , 2018 Key to genus Hybomitra

Tabanidae
Insects described in 1937
Diptera of Europe
Taxa named by Eugène Séguy